Reamwood is a light rail station operated by Santa Clara Valley Transportation Authority (VTA), located in Sunnyvale, California. This station is served by the Orange Line of the VTA Light Rail system.

Service

Station layout

References

External links

Santa Clara Valley Transportation Authority light rail stations
Railway stations in the United States opened in 1999
1999 establishments in California